Cymatosiraceae is a family of diatoms in the order Cymatosirales.

Genera 
Arcocellulus – Brockmanniella – Campylosira – Cymatosira – Cymatosirella – Extubocellulus – Hyalinella – †Kisseleviella – †Koizumia – Lennoxia – Leyanella – Minutocellulus – Minutocellus – Papiliocellulus – Pierrecomperia – Plagiogrammopsis – Pseudoleyanella – Syvertsenia

References

External links 

 
 Cymatosiraceae at WorMS

Diatom families
Cymatosirales